Athletics events at the 2012 Summer Paralympics were held in the Olympic Stadium and in The Mall in London, United Kingdom, from 31 August to 9 September 2012. A restricted number of events were held in the stadium for athletes with intellectual impairment.

Classification

Athletes were given a classification depending on the type and extent of their disability. The classification system allowed athletes to compete against others with a similar level of function.

The athletics classifications are:
11–13: Blind (11) and visually impaired (12, 13) athletes
20: Athletes with an intellectual disability
31–38: Athletes with cerebral palsy
40: Les Autres (others) (including people with dwarfism)
42–46: Amputees
51–58: Athletes with a spinal cord disability

The class numbers were given prefixes of "T" and "F" for track and field events, respectively.

Medal summary

Men's events

Women's events

See also
Athletics at the 2012 Summer Olympics

References

External links
International Paralympic Committee - Athletics classification regulations

T F20